The Reserve Officer Training Unit (Abbr.: ROTU,  – PALAPES) is a military programme that trains undergraduate students to be reserve officers for the Malaysian Armed Forces. Those who complete the training will be commissioned as officers in the Malaysian Armed Forces Reserve, either as Second lieutenants in the Territorial Army Regiment and the Royal Malaysian Air Force Volunteer Reserve, or as Acting Sub-lieutenants in the Royal Malaysian Navy Volunteer Reserve.

History

Origin: The University of Malaya reserve army 
During the Indonesia–Malaysia conflict in 1965, 30 University of Malaya students who were also alumni of the Royal Military College volunteered to enlist for military training at Siputih Training Camp in Batu Gajah, Perak, during their semester break. On 3 April 1965, the staff and lecturers of the University of Malaya formed the 1st University of Malaya Reserve Army Battalion. Due to the lack of a military installation nearby at the time, the staff and 30 students conducted military training in a small room at the Faculty of Arts and Social Sciences. 

When the University of Malaya's reserve army expanded in 1969, the university constructed a five-row wooden structure at KM 8, Jalan Damansara, Kuala Lumpur, to serve as the reserve army's headquarters and training centre. This area was later dubbed "Damansara Camp". The wooden structure was built on University of Malaya's land by the Malaysian Public Works Department as part of an agreement between University of Malaya and the Ministry of Defense. As part of the agreement, the University of Malaya must share the building with the Malaysian Army. With this, the headquarters of the 1st University of Malaya Reserve Army Battalion will be shared with the 11th Infantry Division.

In 1983, the 11th Infantry Division constructed two new structures: a garage and an instructors' quarter. The 11th Infantry Division later relocated from Damansara Camp to Imphal Camp in Kuala Lumpur in 1984, leaving Damansara Camp to be managed solely by the University of Malaya.

Extend the unit to other universities 
With the emergence of a communist insurgency in Malaysia in 1968, the 1st University of Malaya Reserve Army Battalion was expanded in 1970 to three other universities: MARA Institute of Technology (Now known as Universiti Teknologi MARA), University of Agriculture Malaysia (Now known as University of Putra Malaysia), and National University of Malaysia. The MARA Institute of Technology unit became A Company, 1st University of Malaya Reserve Army Battalion, the University of Agriculture Malaysia became B Company, 1st University of Malaya Reserve Army Battalion, and the National University of Malaysia became C Company, 1st University of Malaya Reserve Army Battalion, while the University of Malaya became HQ Company, 1st University of Malaya Reserve Army Battalion.

The creation of the Reserve Officer Training Unit 
Brigadier General Dato' Abdul As Ismail, the Commander of the Territorial Army Regiment at the time, invited all public university vice chancellors and the Director of MARA Institute of Technology to a meeting in 1978 and expressed his desire to establish a military officer training programme at universities to train university lecturers, staff, and students. The opinion was well received, and on 18 December 1978, the Chief of Defense Forces and the Chief of the Army officially established the Reserve Officer Training Unit (: ROTU).

On 26 February 1979, the Chief of the Army convened a meeting with all public university vice chancellors and the Director of MARA Institute of Technology, and directed the universities to establish ROTU at their respective institutions. The National University of Malaysia was the first university to establish ROTU on 1 July 1979, while Professor Mohd Ghazali was appointed as the first commandant and given the honorary rank of Lieutenant Colonel.

The 1st University of Malaya Reserve Army Battalion was officially dissolved on 2 February 1980, and the University of Malaya established their ROTU on 5 February 1980, followed by the University of Agriculture Malaysia on 8 February 1980 and MARA Institute of Technology on 6 March 1980. Until 2017, 18 more ROTUs were established at other universities and institutions, three of which were MARA Institute of Technology branches. In the late 1980s, the Reserve Officer Training Unit was officially renamed the Pasukan Latihan Pegawai Simpanan, or PALAPES for short.

Navy's and Air force's version 
The Navy's version of ROTU, the PALAPES Laut, was introduced in 1986 at Universiti Sains Malaysia, while the Air Force's version of ROTU, the PALAPES Udara, was introduced in 1989 at Universiti Utara Malaysia. All military branches of ROTU remain under one command, but their military training is provided by the respective military branches.

Objectives 
ROTU objectives may differ between universities and institutions, but the core objectives remain the same. The core objectives are as follows:

 To introduce undergraduate students to military field.
 Students are trained to be disciplined and patriotic.
 Providing manpower resources from higher education institutions that have been trained in the military field for the Malaysian Armed Forces, whether regular or reserves.

The Structure of ROTU at universities and institutions 
The ROTU structures differ between universities and institutions. However, each university and institution has a commandant, who is an honorary position given to the vice chancellor of the university or the chief executive officer of the institution, and a deputy commandant, who is the highest position for a staff-in-charge. The Deputy Commandant is assisted by the Head Instructor, an regular officer with the rank of Lieutenant Colonel for universities with larger ROTU and Major or Lieutenant Commander for universities with smaller ROTU. There is an adjutant and a regimental sergeant major below the Head Instructor. All of them are supported by regular officers and other ranks for a variety of tasks.

In addition to regular Malaysian Armed Forces officers and other ranks, the ROTU is assisted by university lecturers or staff who were commissioned from ROTU during their learning days or are still active as reserve officers in any branch of the Malaysian Armed Forces.

Selection and training of ROTU cadets 
Before being commissioned as an officer, ROTU cadets must complete three phases of training, each lasting a year. According to Malaysian government statistics from 2017, the maximum quota for total cadets for a university is 450 cadets for all three phases, with the exception of the National Defence University of Malaysia, which has a quota of 650 cadets, and the Universiti Teknologi MARA campuses, which has a quota of 105 cadets for each campus. Each year, new selections are made available to first-year students, and the number of new students admitted to the training programme is determined by the quota. This quota, however, only applies to the Army ROTU. There is no mention of any other types of ROTU.

ROTU is accessible to full-time first-year bachelor's degree students. They must also not be colorblind. First-year students interested in joining ROTU must submit their names and wait for selection.

Selection 
All ROTU branches have a three-stage selection process. The first and second stages take place in their respective universities and institutions, while the third part takes place elsewhere. At this stage, each student is known as a Bakal Pegawai Kadet, or Potential Officer Cadet in English, and is followed by their batch name, for example, Bakal Pegawai Kadet Ambilan 19.

Physical Fitness Test (Phase 1)

Each potential officer cadet must pass a series of physical fitness tests in accordance with Malaysian Armed Forces standards. Among the tests are the following:

 Cardiovascular evaluation:
  run in less than 15 minutes.
  sprint in less than 11 seconds.

 Strength evaluation:
 35 sit-ups in less than a minute.
Medical Examination (Phase 2)

Each potential officer cadet must be examined to ensure that they do not have any chronic conditions, such as heart disease. They were also tested for asthma, hypertension and colorblindness.

Personality Test (Phase 3)

In phase 3, potential officer cadets are directed to their ROTU branches. They must pass an interview, which is usually done at the respective military bases; for example, the Universiti Malaysia Pahang Navy ROTU went to the RMN Kuantan Naval Base.

Oath-taking ceremony

All potential officer cadets who have completed all phases must take their oath in front of the Commanding Officer of the military base before beginning their phase as an officer cadet.

Training 
The ROTU training that officer cadets must undergo is determined by their ROTU branches. Depending on the year of study, their instruction is divided into three phases.

After completing all three phases of ROTU, officer cadets are commissioned as reserves officers. Undergraduate students whose programmes are only three years long will graduate from the university and continue to serve as reserves officers at military camps near them, whereas undergraduate students whose programmes are longer than three years long, such as engineering or medical programmes, can help train their ROTU units as full-fledged military officers.

Cadets benefits 
Students compete for ROTU slots because of the benefits that come with being selected as a cadet and being commissioned as a military reserve officer.

Military training 
Depending on the ROTU branch, cadets receive military training comparable to that of the regular army. The training is customised to the cadets' phases. In the Army ROTU, for example, cadets must learn different types of weapons based on their stage. Junior cadets must be skilled at using a combat rifle; intermediate cadets must know how to use a grenade launcher and light machine guns; and senior cadets must know how to use a general-purpose machinegun and a portable rocket launcher. Cadets in the Navy ROTU are taught seamanship and how to operate a military ship as part of a crew. Cadets in the Air Force ROTU are educated to be air force infantry while also being introduced to the RMAF's aircraft and operations.

Allowances 
The allowance are paid by the Malaysian Armed Forces to the cadets. All branches of ROTU receive similar allowances. Cadets are sponsored for food in addition to financial allowances as long as they are in one of the three phases.

Hostels 
This varies depending on the university or institution. Cadets are typically provided with a free three-year residence; for example, University of Putra Malaysia places all cadets at Kolej Sultan Alaeddin Suleiman Shah, or KOSASS.

Job opportunities in the armed forces 
Graduates from universities or institutions who have completed their ROTU programmes can continue to serve as reserve military officers by attending reserve units near their home. For them to remain qualified as reserve military officers, they must complete at least 70% of the total annual training. Those who have been inactive for a long time can reactivate their membership by reporting to the nearest reserve camp, but they must go through the process of retaking the fitness test and providing documentation.

Graduates who have completed their ROTU programmes can also apply to work as full-time military officers in the Malaysian Armed Forces by enrolling in the Kursus Pegawai Kadet Graduan. Aside from the military experience gained at ROTU, there are no advantages for ROTU applicants over regular undergraduate graduates for Kursus Pegawai Kadet Graduan. As a result, they are free to join any military branch, even if it is not the same as their ROTU. The Kursus Pegawai Kadet Graduan lasts 9 months.

Cadets ranks structure 
The ranks of ROTU cadets are dependent on their rank in the Malaysian Army Academy, KD Sultan Idris I and Malaysian Air Force Academy. The Army and Air Force ROTU rankings are comparable, but the Navy ROTU is quite different.

Army ROTU ranks

Navy ROTU ranks 
When compared to other branches' ROTUs, the Navy ROTU has a very distinct rank structure. The structure is based on KD Sultan Idris I, Malaysia's version of Britannia Royal Naval College. Both second and third-year cadets have the same rank in Malay, which is Pegawai Kadet Kanan, but the rank in English is named based on seniority. In the Navy ROTU, there are also "rank-holder" positions such as cadets' commanding officer and cadets' executive officer. The position of cadet executive officer is also known as a "Division Commander", and the number of division commanders is determined by the size of the Navy ROTU at the respective universities or institutions. In Navy ROTU, there are two divisions: Thana, denoted by the red colour, and Zain, denoted by the blue colour. For larger ROTU, the divisions can be more than two, but the names Thana and Zain are maintained. For example, Thana Alpha, Thana Bravo, Zain Alpha, and Zain Bravo.

The Malaysian Maritime Academy's Navy ROTU has a different rank structure because cadets must spend a year on a merchant ship for internship, so they skip the Junior Midshipman phase (second year). The training that they should receive during the Junior Midshipman phase was divided into two parts and completed during the first and third years.

Air Force ROTU ranks 
The rank structure of the Air Force ROTU is comparable to that of the Army ROTU. The pattern of their rank epaulette is similar to that of the Army, except instead of green, the Air Force's is dark blue with yellow stripes. The word "MALAYSIA" is written in yellow at the bottom of the epaulette.

Ongoing units of ROTU 
There are currently 21 universities and institutions of higher learning that have established Reserve Officer Training Units.

There is one Air Force ROTU unit at the Universiti Teknologi MARA, Sarawak Branch, which was established in June 2004 but was officially dissolved on 7 July 2013.

See also 

 Reserve Officers' Training Corps
 Army Reserve Officers' Training Corps – U.S. Army ROTC
 Naval Reserve Officers Training Corps – U.S. Navy and U.S. Marine Corps ROTC
 Air Force Reserve Officer Training Corps – U.S. Air Force and U.S. Space Force ROTC
 Reserve Officers' Training Corps (Philippines)
 Reserve Officers' Training Corps (South Korea)

References 

Military education and training in Malaysia
Reserve forces of Malaysia
Military officer training